The canoeing competition at the 1996 Summer Olympics in Atlanta / USA was composed of 16 events in two disciplines, slalom and sprint. Timing in 1/1000ths of a second began at these games for the sprint events.

Medal table

Medal summary

Slalom
Slalom events took place at Ocoee Whitewater Center near Ducktown, Tennessee.

Sprint

Sprint events were held at Lake Lanier, Georgia.

Men's events

Women's events

References
1996 Summer Olympics official report Volume 3. pp. 162–74. 
 

 
1996 Summer Olympics events
1996
Canoeing and kayaking competitions in the United States